A number of merchant vessels have carried the name Sorrento, after the Italian city.

, in service 1925–26
, in active service as of 2010
, an Italian ferry which caught fire in 2015

Ship names